Kevin Noble Maillard is an American professor of law at Syracuse University, and the debut author of the award-winning children's picture book Fry Bread: A Native American Family Story.

Education
Maillard has B.A. in public policy from Duke University, a Juris Doctor degree from the University of Pennsylvania Law School, and a Ph.D. in political science from the University of Michigan.

Biography
Maillard is a member of the Seminole Nation of Oklahoma.

Books
Maillard's 2019 picture book Fry Bread: A Native American Family Story (illustrated by Juana Martinez-Neal) was awarded the 2020 Robert F. Sibert Informational Book Medal, and was the honor book in the 2020 American Indian Youth Literature Awards.

See also
Frybread

References

External links

Food Brings Families Together In 'Fry Bread' - October 31, 2019 Heard on Morning Edition (NPR)
Fry Bread: Children's book explores the connection between cooking and colonization - May 8, 2020 Canadian Broadcasting Corporation

Living people
American children's writers
Syracuse University faculty
Duke University alumni
University of Pennsylvania Law School alumni
University of Michigan alumni
Robert F. Sibert Informational Book Medal winners
Year of birth missing (living people)